Tadeusz Tomaszewski (pronounced ; born 21 February 1959 in Niechanowo) is a Polish politician. He was elected to Sejm on 25 September 2005, getting 12213 votes in 37 Konin district as a candidate from Democratic Left Alliance list.

He was also a member of Sejm between 1993–1997, 1997–2001, 2001–2005, 2005–2007, 2007–2011, 2011–2015, and 2019–2023.

See also
Members of Polish Sejm 2005-2007

External links
Tadeusz Tomaszewski - official page

1959 births
Living people
Democratic Left Alliance politicians
Members of the Polish Sejm 1993–1997
Members of the Polish Sejm 1997–2001
Members of the Polish Sejm 2001–2005
Members of the Polish Sejm 2005–2007
Members of the Polish Sejm 2007–2011
Members of the Polish Sejm 2011–2015
Members of the Polish Sejm 2019–2023
Recipients of the Silver Cross of Merit (Poland)
People from Gniezno County